The 2009 Formula 3 Sudamericana season was the 23rd Formula 3 Sudamericana season. It began on 6 June 2009, at Autódromo Internacional Nelson Piquet in Brasília and ended on 22 November at Autódromo Internacional de Curitiba. Brazilian driver Leonardo Cordeiro won the title.

Drivers and teams
 All drivers competed in Pirelli-shod.

Race calendar and results

Championship standings

References

External links
 Official website

Formula 3 Sudamericana
Sudamericana
Formula 3 Sudamericana seasons
Sudamericana F3